The Museo Rufino Tamayo is an art museum in the city of Oaxaca, Oaxaca, in southern Mexico.

Description
The museum contains collections of pre-Columbian art once owned by artist Rufino Tamayo. It is housed in a colonial-style building.  The displays are arranged according to aesthetic themes.

One of the chief purposes of Tamayo and the museum was to collect the historic pieces, and to protect them from entering the illegal artifact traders market. Tamayo left the museum to his native state of Oaxaca, for his fellow Mexicans awareness of their rich cultural heritage.

See also
Tamayo Contemporary Art Museum —  houses the modern art collection of Rufino Tamayo, in Mexico City.

References

External links

Museums in Oaxaca
Art museums and galleries in Mexico
Pre-Columbian art museums
Biographical museums in Mexico
Art museums established in 1979
Museo Rufino Tamayo
Museo Rufino Tamayo
Archaeological museums in Mexico